A video game publisher is a company that publishes video games that have been developed either internally by the publisher or externally by a video game developer.

They often finance the development, sometimes by paying a video game developer (the publisher calls this external development) and sometimes by paying an internal staff of developers called a studio. The large video game publishers also distribute the games they publish, while some smaller publishers instead hire distribution companies (or larger video game publishers) to distribute the games they publish. Other functions usually performed by the publisher include deciding on and paying for any licenses used by the game; paying for localization; layout, printing, and possibly the writing of the user manual; and the creation of graphic design elements such as the box design. Some large publishers with vertical structure also own publishing subsidiaries (labels).

Large publishers may also attempt to boost efficiency across all internal and external development teams by providing services such as sound design and code packages for commonly needed functionality.

Because the publisher often finances development, it usually tries to manage development risk with a staff of producers or project managers to monitor the progress of the developer, critique ongoing development, and assist as necessary. Most video games created by an external video game developer are paid for with periodic advances on royalties. These advances are paid when the developer reaches certain stages of development, called milestones.

Business risks
Video game publishing is associated with high risk:
 The Christmas selling season accounts for a highly significant portion of industry sales, leading to a concentrated influx of high-quality competition every year in every game category, all in the fourth quarter of the year.
 Product slippage is common due to the uncertain schedules of software development.  Most publishers have suffered a "false launch", in which the development staff assures the company that game development will be completed by a certain date, and a marketing launch is planned around that date, including advertising commitments, and then after all the advertising is paid for, the development staff announces that the game will "slip", and will actually be ready several months later than originally intended.  When the game finally appears, the effects among consumers of the marketing launch—excitement and "buzz" over the release of the game and an intent to purchase have dissipated, and lackluster interest leads to weak sales.  An example of this is the PSP version of Spider-Man 3. These problems are compounded if the game is supposed to ship for the Christmas selling season, but actually slips into the subsequent year. Some developers (notably id and Epic) have alleviated this problem by simply saying that a given game will be released "when it's done", only announcing a definite date once the game is released to manufacturing. However, this sometimes can be problematic as well, as seen with Duke Nukem Forever.
 The industry has become more "hit driven" over the past decade. Consumers buy the game that's best marketed but not necessarily of the highest quality, therefore buying fewer other games in that genre. This has led to much larger game development budgets, as every game publisher tries to ensure that its game is number 1 in its category. It also caused publishers to on occasion force developers to focus on sequels of successful franchises instead of exploring original IP; some publishers such as Activision Blizzard and Electronic Arts have both attracted criticism for acquiring studios with original games and assigning them to support roles in more mainstream franchises.
 Current generation consoles have more advanced graphic capabilities than previous consoles. Taking advantage of those capabilities requires a larger team-size than games on earlier, simpler consoles. In order to compete with the best games on these consoles, there are more characters to animate; all characters must be modeled with a higher level of detail; more textures must be created; the entire art pipeline must be made more complex to allow the creation of normal maps and more complex programming code is required to simulate physics in the game world, and to render everything as precisely and quickly as possible. On this generation of consoles, games commonly require budgets of US$15 million to $20 million. Activision's Spider-Man 3, for example, cost US$35 million to develop, not counting the cost of marketing and sales. Every game financed is, then, a large gamble, and pressure to succeed is high.

 Contrasting with the big budget titles increased expense of "front-line" console games is the casual game market, in which smaller, simpler games are published for PCs and as downloadable console games. Also, Nintendo's Wii console, though debuting in the same generation as the PlayStation 3 and the Xbox 360, requires a smaller development budget, as innovation on the Wii is centered around the use of the Wii Remote and not around the graphics pipeline.
 When publishing for game consoles, game publishers take on the burden of a great deal of inventory risk.  All significant console manufacturers since Nintendo with its NES (1985) have monopolized the manufacture of every game made for their console and have required all publishers to pay a royalty for every game so manufactured.  This royalty must be paid at the time of manufacturing, as opposed to royalty payments in almost all other industries, where royalties are paid upon actual sales of the product—and, importantly, are payable for games that did not sell to a consumer. So, if a game publisher orders one million copies of its game, but half of them do not sell, the publisher has already paid the full console manufacturer royalty on one million copies of the game and has to absorb that cost.

Investor interest
Numerous video game publishers are traded publicly on stock markets. As a group, they have had mixed performance. At present, Electronic Arts is the only third-party publisher present in the S&P 500 diversified list of large U.S. corporations; in April 2010, it entered the Fortune 500 for the first time.

Hype over video game publisher stocks has been breathless at two points:
 In the early 1990s, the introduction of CD-ROM computer drives caused hype about a multimedia revolution that would bring interactive entertainment to the masses.  Several Hollywood movie studios formed "interactive" divisions to profit in this allegedly booming new media.  Most of these divisions later folded after expensively producing several games that were heavy in "full-motion video" content, but light in the quality of gameplay.
 In the United States, revenue from the sales of video and computer games exceeded revenue from film box-office receipts for the first time in the dot-com days of the late 1990s, when technology companies in general were surrounded by hype.  The video game publishers did not, however, experience the same level of rise in stock prices that many dot-com companies saw.  This was probably because video game publishing was seen as a more mature industry whose prospects were fairly well understood, as opposed to the typical exciting dot-com business model with unknown but possibly sky-high prospects.  While many technology stocks were eventually destroyed in the dot-com crash in the early 2000s, the stock prices of the video game publishers recovered as a group; several of the larger publishers such as EA and Take-Two Interactive achieved historical highs in the mid-2000s.

Rankings

Major publishers

 

Mid-size publishers

References

Video game development